Delamar Wash is the main stream in the Delamar Valley, Nevada, United States.

References

Rivers of Nevada
Rivers of Lincoln County, Nevada